David Low Hackett (November 12, 1926 – April 23, 2011) was an American official.

Born in Dedham, Massachusetts, Hackett was appointed by President John F. Kennedy to head the President's Committee on Juvenile Delinquency and Youth Crime. Later, Hackett headed a study group for the establishment of a domestic peace corps group which later became AmeriCorps Vista. A friend of Robert F. Kennedy, Hackett helped with Kennedy's presidential campaign in 1968. He served in the United States Army in Europe during World War II and then went to McGill University, completing a B.A. in 1950. Hackett lived in Bethesda, Maryland. He was the inspiration for the character Phineas in A Separate Peace by John Knowles.  "It's clear that Phineas' house was 848 High Street," across from the Dedham Common.

References

1926 births
2011 deaths
McGill University alumni
Kennedy administration personnel
Military personnel from Dedham, Massachusetts